Fanaposten is a Norwegian newspaper, published in Nesttun in Bergen, and covering the districts of Fana and Ytrebygda. The newspaper was founded in 1978, and its first editor was Hans D. Fasmer. The newspaper is issued twice a week. In 2004 Bergens Tidende took over as owner of Fanaposten. Its editor is Ståle Melhus. It had a circulation of 4,683 in 2008.

References

External links

1978 establishments in Norway
Newspapers established in 1978
Newspapers published in Bergen
Norwegian-language newspapers